Mobile Suit Gundam SEED Destiny is the anime sequel to Mobile Suit Gundam SEED produced by Sunrise and directed by Mitsuo Fukuda. The series spanned 50 episodes, aired in Japan from October 9, 2004 to October 1, 2005 on the Japan News Network television stations Tokyo Broadcasting System and Mainichi Broadcasting System. Set two years after the original Mobile Suit Gundam SEED, the plot follows the new character Shinn Asuka, a soldier from ZAFT, composed of humans born genetically enhanced labelled as Coordinators. As ZAFT is about to enter into another war against the regular human race, the Naturals, the series focuses on Shinn's as well as various returning characters' involvement in the war.

A year after its prequel's finale, and on December 25, 2005, a director's cut version of the final episode called "Final Plus" aired with additional scenes and an epilogue. Gundam SEED Destinys first English broadcast began on Canada's YTV starting on March 9, 2007 and it is also available in the United States on Comcast's Anime Selects On Demand network. In November 2012, Sunrise announced through the last remastered episode of Gundam SEED a Gundam SEED Destiny HD remaster project.

Eight pieces of music were used for the original series. The ending themes are "Reason" by Nami Tamaki from episodes one to thirteen, "Life Goes On" by Mika Arisaka from fourteen to twenty five, "I Wanna Go To A Place..." by Rie Fu from twenty six to thirty seven, and  towards the end, by pop duo See-Saw. The English TV dub used "Pride" in place of "Ignited", but used all other original openings. The TV dub also retained the ending themes. The 2013-2014 HD remaster of Gundam SEED Destiny replace "Reason" with "Result" (a theme originally used for the first Special Edition movie, also by Nami Tamaki) for episodes 12 and 13, and "Wings of Words" with T.M. Revolution's , a theme originally used only as the opening for the "Final Plus" edition of episode 50.

The series was collected in a total of thirteen DVD volumes that were released in Japan from February 24, 2005 A DVD box from the television series that also included the special episode was released on April 9, 2010. The North American release does not include the special episode entitled "Edited" and thus it was not aired on English-speaking networks. "Edited" is an alternate version of episode 6, "The End of the World", and used bits and pieces of scenes of the original episode 6. The DVDs came with a specially made parody episode of Gundam SEED titled Gundam SEED Character Theatre. The series was released on twelve DVDs in North America in uncut bilingual format between March 14, 2006 and January 8, 2008. The Final Plus episode was announced to have been licensed in July 2007, with a single DVD released on April 15, 2008. Two "Anime Legends" DVD boxes volumes from the series were later released on January 13 and May 19, 2009 .

Episode list

Mobile Suit Gundam SEED Destiny: Special Episodes

Mobile Suit Gundam SEED Destiny: Special Edition - Tetralogy movies

References

Mobile Suit Gundam SEED Destiny
Seed Destiny